John Roddick Russell MacGregor, Baron MacGregor of Pulham Market,  (born 14 February 1937), is a politician from the United Kingdom. A member of the Conservative Party, he was the Member of Parliament (MP) for South Norfolk from 1974 to 2001. He served in the Cabinet as Chief Secretary to the Treasury (1985–87), Minister of Agriculture, Fisheries and Food (1987–89), Secretary of State for Education and Science (1989–90), Leader of the House of Commons and Lord President of the Council (1990–92), and Secretary of State for Transport (1992–94). He was made a life peer in 2001.

Early life 
MacGregor was educated at Merchiston Castle School in Edinburgh, then at the University of St Andrews (MA economics and history, 1959) and at King's College London (LLB, 1962). Prior to the 1979 general election he worked for Hill Samuel, a merchant bank.

Member of Parliament
He became an MP at the February 1974 General Election, and served as a Tory whip from 1977 to 1981, when he became a junior minister at the Department of Trade and Industry, moving to MAFF in 1983.

In government
MacGregor entered the Cabinet on 2 September 1985 as Chief Secretary to the Treasury, and was made Minister of Agriculture, Fisheries and Food in 1987 – during the BSE crisis. He was promoted to Secretary of State for Education and Science in July 1989. In the small reshuffle following the resignation of Sir Geoffrey Howe, he was made Leader of the House of Commons and Lord President of the Council just days before Thatcher's own resignation. He continued in this position from 1990 to 1992, although William Keegan writes that he was a contender for the position of Chancellor when John Major came to power. 

MacGregor was appointed Secretary of State for Transport in 1992, remaining in the post until July 1994 when was dismissed from the cabinet. His time as Transport Secretary saw him given responsibility for the privatisation of British Rail and the decision to privatise the Transport Research Laboratory (TRL). He was made a life peer as Baron MacGregor of Pulham Market, of Pulham Market in the County of Norfolk on 5 July 2001. He sat in the House of Lords until his retirement on 26 July 2019.

Honours
MacGregor was appointed an Officer of the Order of the British Empire (OBE) in the 1971 New Year Honours for political services.

Personal interests
MacGregor is an accomplished magician and member of the Magic Circle. He gave regular performances on British television, including guest spots on The Best of Magic and an annual children's charity programme on Anglia Television.

References

External links
 
 House of Commons biography
 

|-

|-

|-

|-

|-

|-

1937 births
Alumni of King's College London
Alumni of the University of St Andrews
British Secretaries of State
British Secretaries of State for Education
Conservative Party (UK) life peers
Conservative Party (UK) MPs for English constituencies
English magicians
Fellows of King's College London
Leaders of the House of Commons of the United Kingdom
Living people
Lord Presidents of the Council
Agriculture ministers of the United Kingdom
Members of the Bow Group
Members of the Privy Council of the United Kingdom
People educated at Merchiston Castle School
Officers of the Order of the British Empire
Secretaries of State for Transport (UK)
UK MPs 1974
UK MPs 1974–1979
UK MPs 1979–1983
UK MPs 1983–1987
UK MPs 1987–1992
UK MPs 1992–1997
UK MPs 1997–2001
People from South Norfolk (district)
Life peers created by Elizabeth II
Chief Secretaries to the Treasury